David Wayne Perkins (born 1951) is an American rock and R&B guitarist, singer, songwriter and session musician. According to a 2017 feature about him on the Alabama website AL.com, he is "arguably the greatest guitarist Alabama ever produced."

Perkins may be best known for his work with The Rolling Stones, who almost brought him into the band. However, he has contributed his skills to a long roster of high-profile artists, including Bob Marley and Joni Mitchell.

Early life and family 
Perkins was born in Birmingham, Alabama. He is the oldest of six children, a brother and four sisters. Both of his parents sang and played guitar. Perkins taught himself to play at age 12.

Music career

Early years as a session guitarist 
At 15, Perkins played his first gig as a session musician, in Bob Grove's Prestige Recording Studio in Birmingham. At 16, he left school and started performing in local bands and released singles with a band called the Vikings with Charles Nettles.

In 1968, drummer Jasper Guarino helped Perkins land a steady job as a session guitarist in a studio owned by Quin Ivy called "Quinvy's" in Muscle Shoals.  Perkins was salaried at $100 a week. This led to work at Muscle Shoals Sound Studio with such names as David Porter and the Soul Children, Dave Crawford and Brad Shapiro, Dee Dee Warwick, Ronnie Milsap, Joe Cocker, Leon Russell, Jimmy Cliff, Jim Capaldi, Steve Winwood and Marlin Greene.

During his time at Muscle Shoals, Perkins was asked to join Lynyrd Skynyrd. Even though that band's lead singer, Ronnie Van Zant, was a very close friend, Perkins did not take the offer, though he came close. He later said, "They didn't need me and I had a lot of other stuff coming my way."

With Smith Perkins Smith 
Perkins left session work to form a band called Smith Perkins Smith, which recorded an album released in 1972. Chris Blackwell signed the trio to Island Records and they became the label's first American act. The group toured in England with Free, as well as Fairport Convention, Argent, Uriah Heep, Family, and Vinegar Joe with Robert Palmer.

With the Wailers 
While in Kingston in the Island Basing Street recording studios, Perkins had been working on the second Smith Perkins Smith album for Island when Chris Blackwell stopped him. "He said there was a Wailer project he wanted me to play on" – Catch a Fire, the 1973 album by Bob Marley and the Wailers, which went platinum. Perkins provided lead guitar overdubs on three tracks on Catch a Fire: "Concrete Jungle," "Stir It Up," and "Baby We've Got a Date." "His contributions to the pioneering LP weren't actually mentioned on the original liner notes — indeed most listeners assumed they were hearing Peter Tosh — but Perkins received credit later."

With Joni Mitchell 
Mitchell's 1974 album Court and Spark has often been called a "classic" or "masterpiece." Perkins was an ingredient in the musical backdrop for her songs. Sounds magazine cited his "oh-so-beautiful guitar work" on "Car on a Hill". Perkins later recalled using James Burton's signature pink paisley Telecaster for that recording. He and Mitchell also were involved romantically for a time.

With Leon Russell 
When Perkins returned to the United States, he played with Leon Russell for two years, in the Shelter People Band and the Gap Band. During this time, he became friends with superstar guitarist Eric Clapton.

With the Rolling Stones 
Clapton arranged for Perkins to audition with The Rolling Stones. As a result, Perkins was one of several guitarists hired to play on the album Black and Blue. The credits for the album list Perkins appearing on three tracks: "Hand of Fate", "Memory Motel," and "Fool to Cry." "Worried About You" was also recorded during these sessions but was not released until 1981 on Tattoo You.

In his memoir Life, Keith Richards said that Perkins was very nearly asked to replace Mick Taylor in the Stones. "We liked Perkins a lot. He was a lovely player...[but] it wasn't so much the playing, when it came down to it. It came down to the fact that Ronnie (Ron Wood) was English!"

Subsequent endeavors 
Following this, Perkins joined the Alabama Power Band (formed by his brother Dale), which became Crimson Tide and recorded two albums.

In Nashville, Perkins wrote music for Catdaddy Music and co-wrote soundtracks with Emmy Award winning composer/producer/remixer Richard Wolf for films including The Karate Kid Part II and Back to School.

Perkins later formed the band Problem Child with Robert Nix and Rick Christian, and played bass with Lonnie Mack.

During his long career, Perkins played session guitar with artists including the Alabama State Troupers, Ben Atkins, Michael Bolton, Angela Bofill, the Everly Brothers, the Oak Ridge Boys, Billy Ray Cyrus, Ray Reach and many others.

In 1995, Perkins recorded his first solo album, Mendo Hotel. In 2005, he released his latest, Ramblin' Heart.

Later life 
Some time later, Wayne Perkins was diagnosed with multiple brain tumors. He was treated, but occasionally suffers from crippling headaches. He retired to Argo, where he lives with his brother.

Discography 

1971 Hills of Indiana  Lonnie Mack ; Living by the Days  Don Nix ; Lovejoy Albert King; Mary Called Jeanie Greene; Ronnie Milsap Ronnie Milsap
1972 Alabama State Troupers Road Show  Alabama State Troupers; Dinnertime Alex Taylor; Catch a Fire Bob Marley & The Wailers; John David Souther John David Souther; Raised on Records P.F. Sloan; Smith Perkins Smith Smith Perkins Smith; Smokestack Lighting Mike Harrison; Stories We Could Tell The Everly Brothers; Tiptoe Past the Dragon Marlin Greene
1973 Last Stage for Silverworld Kenny Young; October Claire Hamill
1973 Catch a Fire, Bob Marley and the Wailers. Lead guitar overdubs on "Concrete Jungle", "Stir It Up", and "Baby We've Got a Date"
1974 Court and Spark, Joni Mitchell; Hobos Heroes & Street Corner Clowns Don Nix; Monkey Grip Bill Wyman
1975 Michael Bolotin, Michael Bolton (released under Bolton's birth name)
1976 As Long as You Love Me, Mickey Thomas; Black and Blue, The Rolling Stones; Diggin' It, Dunn & Rubini; Glass Heart, Allan Rich
1978 Levon Helm Levon Helm; Skynyrd's First and...Last Lynyrd Skynyrd
1979 Next Song Is... Keith Herman
1980 I Had to Say It Millie Jackson; McGuinn-Hillman Roger McGuinn with Chris Hillman; Storm Windows John Prine
1981 Gimme You Billy Burnette; Mean Streets McGuinn & Hillman; Plain from the Heart Delbert McClinton; Reunion Jerry Jeff Walker; Tattoo You The Rolling Stones
1982 Night After Night Steve Cropper; No Fun Aloud Glenn Frey; Old Enough Lou Ann Barton
1983 American Made The Oak Ridge Boys; E.S.P. (Extra Sexual Persuasion) Millie Jackson
1984 Greatest Hits, Vol. 2 The Oak Ridge Boys
1985 Home Again The Everly Brothers; Step on Out The Oak Ridge Boys
1986 Back to School Original Soundtrack
1991 Early Years Michael Bolton; Loner Prince Phillip Mitchell
1992 Songs of Freedom Bob Marley & The Wailers
1993 Mr. President Ray Reach and Various Artists.  A song, produced by Ray Reach, performed by Alabama talent, benefitting the homeless in the Birmingham, Alabama area. Artists and studios who donated their time and efforts to make this record include: choral students from Jefferson County schools, Chuck Leavell (Keyboards), Charlie Hayward (Bass), Chuck Tilley (Drums), Kelley O'Ne]] (Saxophone), Wayne Perkins (Guitar), Front Row Productions and Airwave Productions Group.
1993 Jump Back: The Best of the Rolling Stones 1971–1993 The Rolling Stones; Ultimate Collection Albert King
1994 Classics, Vol. 2: Plain from the Heart Delbert McClinton; Classics, Volume 1 Delbert McClinton; Heartaches & Harmonies [Box Set] The Everly Brothers
1995 Mendo Hotel Wayne Perkins; Soul Children – Best of Two Worlds The Soul Children
1996 So I Can Love You-Untouched The Emotions
1997 Count On Me James Clark, Produced by Ray Reach
1998 At Home in Muscle Shoals Bobby Womack; House Rent Party  Various Artists; Skynyrd's First: The Complete Muscle Shoals Album Lynyrd Skynyrd
2001 Catch a Fire [Bonus Tracks] Bob Marley & The Wailers; Catch a Fire [Deluxe Edition] Bob Marley & The Wailers; Jealous Kind/Plain from the Heart Delbert McClinton
2002 Forty Licks The Rolling Stones; Patchouli Ben Atkins
2003 Babylon by Bus/Catch a Fire/Burnin''' [Deluxe Editions] Bob Marley; Rockin' Memphis: 1960s-1970s, Vol. 1 Various Artists; Thyrty: The 30th Anniversary Collection Lynyrd Skynyrd; Uprising/Kaya/Catch a Fire [Deluxe Editions] Bob Marley; Every Little Lie Ken Valdez
2005 Even More Good Whiskey: A Collection of Contemporary Various Artists; Greatest Hits Lynyrd Skynyrd; Levon Helm [Bonus Track] Levon Helm; Ramblin' Heart Wayne Perkins
2006 Monkey Grip [Bonus Tracks] Bill Wyman; Ronnie Milsap [Bonus Track] Ronnie Milsap; Stax Profiles'' Albert King

References

External links 
 Alabama Legacy

1951 births
Living people
Musicians from Birmingham, Alabama
American male singers
American rock singers
American rock guitarists
American male guitarists
Guitarists from Alabama
20th-century American guitarists
20th-century American male musicians